Moondarra (originally named Pearson) was a railway station on the Walhalla narrow gauge line in Gippsland, Victoria, Australia. The station was opened in 1910, consisting of a "waiting shed" and a goods siding. For a time a tramway also operated from the station, which opened in March 1937 and closed during the 1940s.

References

Disused railway stations in Victoria (Australia)
Transport in Gippsland (region)
Shire of Baw Baw
Walhalla railway line